Guarinos is a municipality in northern Goiás state, Brazil.

Highway Connections
Connections are made from Goiânia by  GO-080 / Nerópolis / São Francisco de Goiás / BR-153 / Jaraguá / Rianápolis / Rialma / GO-336 / Itapaci / GO-154 / Pilar de Goiás / GO-439. ( unpaved)  See Seplan

Neighboring municipalities are Pilar de Goiás, Itapaci, Crixás, Nova América, and Santa Terezinha de Goiás

Demographics
Population growth rate: -2.51% from 1996/2007
Urban population: 1174
Rural population: 1237.

The economy
The main economic activities were cattle raising, agriculture and services. There were 23 retail units in August 2007. There were only 35 automobiles in 2007, the lowest number in the state. The main agricultural activities were cattle raising (26,100 head in 2007), and cultivation of rice, beans, manioc, corn, and bananas.

Health and education
The literacy rate was 83.3% in 2000, while there were 5 schools with 594 students in 2006.  There were no hospitals and only one doctor. 
The infant mortality rate was 33.15 in 1,000 live births while the score on the MHDI (Municipal Human Development Index was 0.694
The state ranking was 214 (out of 242 municipalities in 2000) and the national ranking was 3,096 (out of 5,507 municipalities in 2000). Data are from 2000.  For the complete list see frigoletto.com.br

See also 
 List of municipalities in Goiás

References

Frigoletto

Municipalities in Goiás